Digram or digramme may refer to:

 a bigram or digram, a sequence of two words, syllables, or letters
 a digraph (orthography), a pair of letters used to write one speech sound
 a Taixuanjing symbol with two lines

See also
 Digraph (disambiguation)
 Trigram (disambiguation)